Thelymitra speciosa, commonly called the eastern Queen of Sheba, is a species of orchid in the family Orchidaceae and endemic to the south-west of Western Australia. It has a single erect, spiral, dark green leaf with a purplish base and one or two glossy, purplish flowers with broad reddish edges and yellowish margins.  There are two bright yellow or orange arms on the sides of the column.

Description
There are two bright yellow or orange ear-like arms on the sides of the column. The flowers are insect pollinated and open widely on hot days. Flowering occurs in August and September.

Taxonomy and naming
Thelymitra speciosa was first formally described in 2009 by Jeff Jeanes and the description was published in Muelleria. The specific epithet (speciosa) is a Latin word meaning "showy" or "splendid ", referring to this " very spectacular and showy species".

Distribution and habitat
The eastern Queen of Sheba grows with dense shrubs in winter-wet areas between the Stirling Ranges and Lake Grace in the Avon Wheatbelt, Esperance Plains and Mallee biogeographic regions.

Conservation
Thelymitra speciosa is classified as "not threatened" by the Western Australian Government Department of Parks and Wildlife.

References

External links

speciosa
Endemic orchids of Australia
Orchids of Western Australia
Plants described in 2009